The Apple Store is a chain of retail stores owned and operated by Apple Inc. The stores sell various Apple products, including Mac personal computers, iPhone smartphones, iPad tablet computers, Apple Watch smartwatches, Apple TV digital media players, software, and both Apple-branded and selected third-party accessories.

The first Apple Stores were originally opened as two locations in May 2001 by then-CEO Steve Jobs, after years of attempting but failing store-within-a-store concepts. Seeing a need for improved retail presentation of the company's products, he began an effort in 1997 to revamp the retail program to get an improved relationship with consumers and hired Ron Johnson in 2000. Jobs relaunched Apple's online store in 1997 and opened the first two physical stores in 2001. The media initially speculated that Apple would fail, but its stores were highly successful, bypassing the sales numbers of competing nearby stores and within three years reached US$1 billion in annual sales, becoming the fastest retailer in history to do so. Apple has expanded the number of retail locations and its geographical coverage over the years, with 522 stores across 25 countries and regions worldwide, opening its newest store at American Dream Mall in East Rutherford, New Jersey on December 3, 2022. Strong product sales have placed Apple among the top-tier retail stores, with sales over $16 billion globally in 2011.

In May 2016, Angela Ahrendts, Apple's then-Senior Vice President of retail, unveiled a significantly redesigned Apple Store in Union Square, San Francisco, featuring large glass doors for the entry, open spaces, and rebranded rooms. In addition to purchasing products, consumers can get advice and help from "Creative Pros" – individuals with specialized knowledge of creative arts; get product support in a tree-lined Genius Grove; and attend sessions, conferences, and community events, with Ahrendts commenting that the goal is to make Apple Stores into "town squares", a place where people naturally meet up and spend time. The new design will be applied to all Apple Stores worldwide, a process that has seen stores temporarily relocate or close.

Many Apple Stores are located inside shopping malls, but Apple has built several stand-alone flagship stores in high-profile locations. It has been granted design patents and received architectural awards for its stores' designs and construction, specifically for its use of glass staircases and cubes. The success of Apple Stores has had significant influence over other consumer electronics retailers, who have lost traffic, control and profits due to perceived higher quality of service and products at Apple Stores. Apple's notable brand loyalty among consumers causes long lines of hundreds of people at new Apple Store openings or product releases. Due to the popularity of the brand, Apple receives many job applications, many of which come from young workers. Apple Store employees receive above-average pay, are offered money toward education and health care, and receive product discounts; however, there are limited or no paths of career advancement. A May 2016 report with an anonymous retail employee highlighted a hostile work environment with harassment from customers, intense internal criticism, and a lack of significant bonuses for securing major business contracts.

Overview 

Many Apple Stores are located inside shopping malls, but Apple has several stand-alone flagship stores in high-profile locations, such as the one located in Grand Central Terminal in New York City. Several multi-level stores feature glass staircases, and some also glass bridges. The New York Times wrote in 2011 that these features were part of then-CEO Steve Jobs' extensive attention to detail, and Apple received a design patent in 2002 for its glass staircase design. Historically, Apple has partnered with architectural firm Bohlin Cywinski Jackson in designing and creating its original retail stores, and has in recent years partnered with architectural firm Foster + Partners in designing its newer stores, as well as its corporate Apple Park campus.

Apple has received numerous architectural awards for its store designs, and its "iconic" glass cube, designed in part by Peter Bohlin, at Apple's Fifth Avenue store in New York City, received a separate design patent in 2014.

Ron Johnson held the position of Senior Vice President of Retail Operations from 2001 until November 1, 2011. During his tenure, it was reported that while Johnson was responsible for site selection, in-store service, and store layout, inventory was controlled by then-COO and now-CEO Tim Cook, who has a background in supply chain management. In January 2012, Apple transferred retail leadership to John Browett. However, after attempts to cut costs, including reducing new hires and limiting staff hours, he was fired after six months, later telling a conference that he "just didn’t fit with the way they ran the business". In October 2013, Apple hired Angela Ahrendts from Burberry.  When Ahrendts left in April 2019, Deirdre O’Brien expanded from Worldwide Sales and Operations, to People, and currently, to People and Retail. In an interview with Funke Mediengruppe in May 2021 she commented, Apple is sticking to its plan to open more stores around the globe in the future, as reported by Bloomberg.

Work environment

Due to the popularity of the brand, applicants for jobs at Apple Stores are numerous, with many young workers applying. The pace of work is high due to the popularity of the iPhone and iPad. Employees typically work for only a few years as career prospects are limited with no path of advancement other than limited retail management slots. Apple Store employees make above-average pay for retail employees and are offered benefits including 401(k) plans, product discounts, and reduced price on stock. The retention rate for the technicians who staff the Genius Bar is more than 90%.

A May 2016 Business Insider article featured a lengthy interview with an anonymous Apple Store retail worker in the United Kingdom, where the employee highlighted significant dissatisfaction and issues for retail workers, including harassment and death threats from customers, an intense internal criticism policy that feels "like a cult", a lack of any significant bonus if a worker manages to secure a business contract worth "hundreds of thousands", a lack of promotion opportunities, and are paid so little that many workers are unable to buy products themselves even with a "generous" discount on any Apple product or Apple stock.

According to an April 2022 press release, over 70 percent of the eligible employees in the Apple Store located in the Cumberland Mall in Atlanta, Georgia, have signified interest in unionizing. The employees asked for a $28 per hour wage, better benefits, and profit-sharing. If successful, the effort would make the store the first unionized Apple retail store in the United States.

Countries and regions

History

Third-party retail
Steve Jobs, co-founder of Apple, returned to the company as interim CEO in 1997. According to his biographer Walter Isaacson, Jobs began a concerted campaign to help sales by improving the retail presentation of Macintosh computers. Even with new products launched under his watch, like the iMac and the PowerBook G3 and an online store, Apple still relied heavily on big-box computer and electronics stores for most of its sales. There, customers continued to deal with poorly trained and ill-maintained Mac sections that did not foster customer loyalty to Apple and did not help differentiate the Mac user experience from Windows. In fact, the retailer trend was towards selling their own generic in-house brand PCs which used even cheaper components than those by major PC makers, increasing retailer overall margins by keeping the manufacturing profits. This "provided a powerful profit motive to convert customers interested in buying a Mac into the owners of a new, cheaply assembled, house brand PC".

Tim Cook, who joined Apple in 1998 as Senior Vice President for Worldwide Operations, announced the company would "cut some channel partners that may not be providing the buying experience [Apple expects]. We're not happy with everybody." Jobs severed Apple's ties with every big box retailer, including Sears, Montgomery Ward, Best Buy, Circuit City, Computer City, and Office Max to focus its retail efforts with CompUSA. Between 1997 and 2000, the number of Mac authorized resellers dropped from 20,000 to just 11,000. The majority of these were cuts made by Apple itself. Jobs proclaimed that Apple would be targeting Dell as a competitor, with Cook's mandate to match or exceed Dell's lean inventories and streamlined supply chain. Jobs made an open statement to Michael Dell, "with our new products and our new store and our new build-to-order, we're coming after you, buddy." While Dell had operated as direct mail order and online order company, having pulled out of retailers to realize greater profit margins and efficiency, Apple had direct orders with sales handled by its channel partners, other mail order resellers, independent dealerships, and the new relationship with CompUSA to build "stores within a store".

Jobs did a study for stand-alone "store within a store" for 34 sites in Japan. These sites were designed by Eight Inc. and CEO Tim Kobe who was designing the Apple MacWorld and product launch events with Apple. CompUSA was one of the few retailers that kept its Apple contract by agreeing to adopt Apple's "store within a store" concept designed by Eight Inc. This required that approximately 15% of each CompUSA store would be set aside for Mac hardware and software (including non-Apple products) and would play host to a part-time Apple salesperson. However, the "store within a store" approach did not meet expectations, in part because the Apple section was in the lowest-traffic area of CompUSA stores. CompUSA president Jim Halpin, who proclaimed that he would make Apple products his top priority, was forced to resign a year later. Also, CompUSA had trouble finding well-trained staff, as most store clerks usually steered customers away from Macs and towards Windows PCs. Through these setbacks, CompUSA sales of Macs had increased. Apple then added Best Buy as a second authorized reseller. Challenges still remained, as resellers' profit margins on selling Macs was only around 9%, and selling Macs was only worthwhile if ongoing service and support contracts were provided, of which retailer experiences were inconsistent.

Online store 
In 1997, the year Steve Jobs returned to Apple, Dell founder and CEO Michael Dell was asked how he would fix Apple. Dell responded: "I'd shut it down and give the money back to the shareholders". This angered Jobs, due to Dell's success with its online store originally built by NeXT, his former business that Apple acquired to bring Jobs back. A team of Apple and NeXT employees spent several months building an online store that would be better than Dell's. On November 10, 1997, Steve Jobs announced the online store at an Apple press event, and during his keynote speech, he said: "I guess what we want to tell you, Michael, is that with our new products and our new store and our new build-to-order manufacturing, we're coming after you, buddy."

In August 2015, Apple revamped the online storefront, removing the dedicated "Store" tab and making the entire website a retail experience.

Origins
Jobs believed the Apple retail program needed to fundamentally change the relationship to the customer, and provide more control over the presentation of Apple products and the Apple brand message. Jobs recognized the limitations of third-party retailing and began investigating options to change the model.

In 1999, Jobs personally recruited Millard Drexler, former CEO of Gap Inc., to serve on Apple's board of directors. In 2000, Jobs hired Ron Johnson from Target. The retail and development teams headed by Allen Moyer from The Walt Disney Company then began a series of mock-ups for the Apple Store inside a warehouse near the company's Cupertino headquarters.

On May 15, 2001, Jobs hosted a press event at Apple's first store, located at the Tysons Corner Center mall in Tysons, Virginia near Washington, D.C. The store officially opened on May 19, along with another store in Glendale Galleria in Glendale, California.

Expansion 

Several publications and analysts predicted the failure of Apple Stores. However, the Apple retail program established its merits, bypassing the sales-per-square-foot measurement of competing nearby stores, and in 2004 reached $1 billion in annual sales, the fastest of any retailer in history. Sales continued to grow, reaching $1 billion a quarter by 2006. Then-CEO Steve Jobs said that "People haven't been willing to invest this much time and money or engineering in a store before", adding that "It's not important if the customer knows that. They just feel it. They feel something's a little different." In 2011, Apple Stores in the United States had an average revenue of $473,000 for each employee. According to research firm RetailSails, the Apple Store chain ranked first among U.S. retailers in terms of sales per unit area in 2011, almost doubling Tiffany, the second retailer on the list. On a global level, all Apple Stores had a combined revenue of US$16 billion. Under the leadership of Ron Johnson, the former senior Vice President of Retail Operations, the Apple Stores have, according to an article in The New York Times, been responsible for "[turning] the boring computer sales floor into a sleek playroom filled with gadgets". The Apple Stores have also been credited with raising the company's brand equity, with Scott Galloway, Professor of Marketing at New York University Stern School of Business, stating that the Stores are the "temple to the brand which is this unbelievable experience called an Apple Store, and then you have this very mediocre experience called an AT&T or Verizon connect your phone experience for Samsung and the other Android players".

Apple has since re-established ties with major big box retailers like Best Buy and Staples. Authorized Apple resellers have a dedicated store-within-a-store section, offering a distinctive Apple-style experience to showcase products. The relationship with Best Buy calls for the company to send Apple Solutions Consultants (ASCs) to train Best Buy employees to be familiar with Apple's product lineup.

In an interview with Funke Mediengruppe in May 2021 Deirdre O'Brien commented, "Apple is sticking to its plan to open more stores around the globe in the future."

Influence 
Apple Stores have considerably changed the landscape for consumer electronics retailers and influenced other technological companies to follow suit. According to The Globe and Mail, "Apple’s retail stores have taken traffic, control and profits away from Verizon as well as electronics retailers, such as Best Buy, that once looked at wireless phones as a lucrative profit source". CNET has reported that the "Apple retail experience hurts Best Buy" and noted, "Buy a MacBook at the Apple Store and it's hard to go back to the Best Buy Windows laptop buying experience". The publication also wrote that "Apple salespeople are generally more knowledgeable, the products themselves are generally higher quality, and the stores are more appealing, aesthetically and practically."

In October 2009, reports surfaced that Steve Jobs and his retail team would help "drastically overhaul" Disney Stores. His involvement was described by The New York Times as "particularly notable", given his work on the "highly successful" Apple Stores and his election to Disney's board of directors in 2006.

In August 2009, the London Evening Standard reported that Apple's first store in the United Kingdom, at Regent Street, was the most profitable shop of its size in London, with the highest sales per square foot, taking in £60 million a year, or £2,000 per square foot.

Many other electronics retailers from around the world such as Huawei, Samsung, Xiaomi started to follow the designing trend of Apple Store.

Redesign 

In May 2016, Apple significantly redesigned its Union Square Apple Store in downtown San Francisco, adding large glass doors for the entry, open spaces with touch-sensitive tables and shelves for product displays, and rebranded rooms for the store. "The Avenue" is the central location for hardware, as well as for receiving advice from salespersons and "Creative Pros" with specialized knowledge of music, photography, creativity, and apps. The "Genius Bar" becomes the "Genius Grove", a tree-lined area for help and support. "The Forum" features a large video screen and offers game nights, sessions with experts in creative arts, and community events. "The Plaza", while limited to select locations, offers a "park-like" space outside the store featuring free 24/7 Wi-Fi access and will host live concerts on some weekends. Designed by Jony Ive and Angela Ahrendts, the idea was to make Apple Stores into "town squares", in which people come naturally to the store as a gathering place, and to "help foster human experiences that draw people out of their digital bubbles". The new design will be adopted to every store Apple has, and while renovation is undergoing, stores are either relocated or temporarily closed.

In April 2017, Apple announced that its "Today at Apple" educational sessions, which launched with its Union Square redesign in 2016 and offer more than 60 free hands-on sessions for creative skills, will also be expanded to all of its stores.

Starting May 2018, a Video Wall was added to stores around the world, and upgrade some stores like Apple Palo Alto.

Genius Bar

All Apple Stores feature a Genius Bar, where customers can receive technical advice or set up service and repair for their products. The Genius Bar provides hardware service on products that are not classified vintage or obsolete. However, in most cases the Geniuses will at least attempt to assist customers with older hardware.

The Genius Bar at Apple Stores offers same-day service for both  OLED/LCD screen and lithium-ion battery replacement. If the in-house technician needs to send the affected device to an Apple Repair Center, most repaired or replaced iPhones will be returned or ready for pickup in approximately 3 business days.

In May 2017, Apple launched a new program called Today at Apple. Customers can come in and receive free training from a Creative in more than 60 different sessions. Topics include basic device knowledge, Apple's professional film, and music editing software, coding for kids, and tools for using Apple products in classroom-based learning.

The largest Genius Bar in the world is located in Amsterdam.

Store openings 
Apple Store openings and new product releases can draw crowds of hundreds, with some waiting in line as much as a day before the opening. The opening of New York City's Fifth Avenue store in 2006 was highly frequented, and had visitors from Europe who flew in for the event.

Apple Company Store 

In 1993, Apple opened a store at its Apple Campus in Cupertino, California. At the time, the store was the only place in the world where Apple merchandise could be purchased, including T-shirts, mugs, and pens. In June 2015, the store was closed for renovations, and in September it was reopened, offering a new design and, for the first time, selling iPhones.

Imitations

In July 2011, an American expatriate blogger who lives in the southwestern Chinese city of Kunming reported on her discovery of what she called "the best ripoff store we had ever seen"—a fake Apple Store, complete with the glass exterior, wood display tables, winding staircase and large promotional posters found in legitimate Apple Stores, and with employees wearing lanyards and the same T-shirts as actual Apple Store employees. The Wall Street Journal reported that the store had "gotten widespread international attention for the remarkable lengths to which its proprietors seem to have gone to mimic the look and feel of a real Apple Store." The fake Apple Store was mentioned by U.S. presidential contender Mitt Romney in the second 2012 election debate. Chinese law prohibits retailers from copying the look and feel of competitors' stores, but enforcement is lax.

According to The Wall Street Journal, unauthorized Apple resellers are found throughout China; the blogger's original post noted that two such stores were located within walking distance of the first knockoff, one of them with a misspelled sign reading "Apple Stoer". An employee of the first knockoff confirmed that the store was not one of the 13 authorized Apple resellers in Kunming. In a follow-up report, Reuters indicated that local authorities in Kunming had closed two fake Apple Stores in that city due to lack of official business permits, but allowed three other such stores to stay open, including the one that had attracted international attention. The operators of that store had applied for a reseller license from Apple. At the time of the report, only four legitimate Apple Stores had opened in China, with two in Beijing and two in Shanghai.

See also

 ComputerWare
 Google Store
 Microsoft Store
 Samsung Experience Store

References

External links

Apple Inc. services
Consumer electronics retailers
Consumer electronics retailers in the United States
Retail companies based in California
American companies established in 2001
Computer-related introductions in 2001
Retail companies established in 2001
2001 establishments in California